The Pinto Kid is a 1941 American Western film directed by Lambert Hillyer and starring Charles Starrett, Louise Currie and Bob Nolan.

Cast
 Charles Starrett as Jud Calvert 
 Louise Currie as Betty Ainsley 
 Bob Nolan as Bob 
 Paul Sutton as Vic Landreau 
 Hank Bell as Hank 
 Francis Walker as Curt Harvey 
 Ernie Adams as Ed Slade 
 Jack Rockwell as Marshal 
 Roger Gray as Dan Foster 
 Dick Botiller as Henchman Cheyenne
 Sons of the Pioneers as Musicians

References

Bibliography
 Pitts, Michael R. Western Movies: A Guide to 5,105 Feature Films. McFarland, 2012.

External links
 

1941 films
1941 Western (genre) films
American black-and-white films
American Western (genre) films
Films directed by Lambert Hillyer
Columbia Pictures films
1940s English-language films
1940s American films